Myaungmya is a town in Myaungmya Township, Ayeyarwady Region, Myanmar.

The town is home to the Myanmar Union Adventist Seminary, a Seventh-day Adventist seminary and Myaungmya Education College. As of 2014 the population was 58,698.

Myaungmya is where Daw Khin Kyi, the wife of national leader General Aung San was born. It was also one of the towns where anti-colonial nationalistic education was implemented, with U Nu serving as district education officer.Also Dee Doke U Ba Cho, Burma Leader was born.Myaungmya city is the main exporter of rice in Myanmar.

George Orwell served as assistant superintendent of police in Myaungmya in 1924.

Climate

References

Populated places in Ayeyarwady Region
Township capitals of Myanmar